Skyway Enterprises Inc. is an American airline based in Kissimmee, Florida, United States. It operates domestic/international on demand cargo and passenger charter flights, as well as contract flights for FedEx, UPS, and Government.

History
The airline was established in 1981 in Michigan as a Cessna dealership, and started operations with cargo charters in 1983. It moved operations to Kissimmee in 1989. In February 2021, Skyways was purchased by JMB Aviation Group, owner of Transcarga.

Destinations

Fleet

Current fleet

As of September 2022 the Skyway Enterprises fleet includes:

Retired fleet
2 Learjet 23
1 Learjet 24D
1 McDonnell Douglas DC-9-15F
5 Shorts 330-200

Accidents and incidents
2 February 1998 - Two Skyway Enterprises Shorts 330-200 (N2630A and N2629Y) were damaged beyond repair by a tornado at Miami International Airport. Both aircraft had to be written off. No one was injured.
9 April 2003 - Skyway Enterprises Shorts 330-200 (N805SW), on a flight from Pittsburgh was about to land at DuBois Regional Airport, Pennsylvania, when an engine surged, the pilot attempted to go around again to land and crashed left of the runway. The aircraft was substantially damaged but the two crew survived.

29 October 2014 - Skyway Enterprises Flight 7101, a Shorts 360-200 (N380MQ), on a flight from Princess Juliana International Airport, Netherlands Antilles to Luis Muñoz Marín International Airport, Puerto Rico,  crashed into the water off Sint Maarten-Juliana Airport shortly after takeoff from runway 28, killing the two crewmen on board. The body of German national Eric Schnell (49), the pilot, was discovered the night of the incident. Co-pilot Rigoberto Lopez may still be strapped in his seat in the plane wreckage, according to Wendell Thode, Coast Guard Acting Head and Head of Operation.

See also
List of airlines of the United States

References

External links

Skyway Enterprises

Charter airlines of the United States
Airlines established in 1981
Cargo airlines of the United States
Airlines based in Florida
American companies established in 1981
1981 establishments in Michigan
Airlines based in Michigan